"San Antone" / "The Great Divide" is a limited edition 7" vinyl single by alternative country band Whiskeytown, released by Geffen Records in 2009 for Record Store Day.  Both tracks are previously unreleased recordings from the band's 1996 "Baseball Park" sessions.

A live rendition of "The Great Divide" was previously released in 1996 on the compilation CD Power of Tower: Live from the WXDU Lounge.

Track listing

References

2009 singles
Whiskeytown songs
Record Store Day releases
Songs written by Ryan Adams
Songs written by Phil Wandscher
Geffen Records singles